Arthur Bienenstock (born 1935) is professor emeritus of Photon Science at Stanford University. He is also a member of the National Science Board.

He received his B.S. in 1955 and M.S. in 1957 from the Polytechnic Institute of Brooklyn, and a Ph.D. in 1962 from Harvard University. He was the former director of the Stanford Synchrotron Radiation Lightsource from 1978 to 1998.

He was Vice Provost and Dean of Research at Stanford University from 2003 until 2006.

He is a former president of the American Physical Society, serving in that role in 2008, and was a recipient of the 2018 AAAS Philip Hauge Abelson Prize.

External links 

 Oral history interview transcript for Arthur Bienenstock on 22 April 2020, American Institute of Physics, Niels Bohr Library and Archives
 Artie Bienenstock: An Oral History, Stanford Historical Society Oral History Program, 2010.

References

1935 births
Living people
Stanford University Department of Applied Physics faculty
Fellows of the American Physical Society
Harvard University alumni
Polytechnic Institute of New York University alumni
21st-century American physicists
20th-century American physicists
Presidents of the American Physical Society